The long-clawed mole vole (Prometheomys schaposchnikowi) is a species of rodent in the family Cricetidae.  It is the only species in the genus Prometheomys.
It is found in Georgia and Turkey.

References

Voles and lemmings
Mammals described in 1901
Taxa named by Konstantin Satunin
Taxonomy articles created by Polbot